Panglong may refer to:

Places
 Panglong, Southern Shan State
 Panglong or Pan Lon, a town in Wa State settled by Hui people fleeing persecution in Yunnan
 Panglong, Northern Shan State, a ruby mining town
 Panglong (24°6'0"N 98°19'0"E), another name for Mong Ko in Mu Se District
 Panglong (24°3'0"N 98°9'0"E), a village near Kumpa in Mu Se District
 Panglong (23°53'0"N 98°22'0"E), a village near Nawnghoi mountain in Mu Se District

Other
 Panglong Agreement, an agreement signed at the Panglong Conference
 Panglong Conference, a conference held at Panglong to discuss Burmese independence from the United Kingdom
 Panglong University, in Panglong, Southern Shan State, Myanmar

See also
 Panlong (disambiguation)

Populated places in Shan State